Jon Aurtenetxe Borde (born 3 January 1992) is a Spanish professional footballer who plays mainly as a left-back but also as a central defender.

Club career

Athletic Bilbao
Born in Amorebieta-Etxano, Biscay, Aurtenetxe joined Athletic Bilbao's youth system at the age of 10, arriving from neighbouring SD Amorebieta and being a finalist in the Copa del Rey Juvenil in 2009– he would lift the trophy the following year. On 16 December of that year, even before playing his first game with the reserves, the 17-year-old appeared for the first team in the UEFA Europa League, featuring the full 90 minutes in a 3–0 group stage home loss against SV Werder Bremen.

Aurtenetxe made his La Liga debut on 28 August 2010, starting and being booked in a 1–0 win at Hércules CF. His season was curtailed by a serious shoulder injury, and he was definitely promoted to the main squad for 2011–12 under new manager Marcelo Bielsa; he played 54 official matches during the campaign and scored four goals to help the Basques reach both the Copa del Rey and the Europa League finals, netting an important one in the club's 2–1 away defeat to Sporting CP in the latter competition's semi-finals (4–3 aggregate victory).

Aurtenetxe was a regular selection for Athletic in 2012–13 but, after the appointment of Ernesto Valverde as manager, he was overlooked for Mikel Balenziaga and featured rarely. He served loans at top-flight RC Celta de Vigo and CD Tenerife of Segunda División, and in summer 2016 he terminated his contract and moved to second-tier side CD Mirandés on a one-year deal.

Amorebieta and Dundee
In August 2017, after some weeks without a club, Aurtenexte joined Segunda División B's Amorebieta, returning to where he had played as a child 15 years earlier and reuniting with his former Athletic teammate Joseba Etxeberria who was now acting as manager. On 29 August, it was announced that he had left.

On 30 August 2017, Aurtenetxe signed for Dundee on a contract until January 2018. He made his Scottish Premiership debut on 28 October, coming on as a 64th-minute substitute in a 3–1 home loss against Hamilton Academical. He agreed to a new deal on 12 January 2018 that kept him at Dens Park until the end of the season, following which he was released.

Aurtenetxe returned to Amorebieta for the 2018 pre-season, on the same understanding as the previous year that he would be allowed to leave if he received a better offer from another club. On 19 July, he acted as captain in a friendly against former employers Athletic Bilbao.

Later career
In late December 2018, Aurtenetxe agreed to join Australian National Premier League side Adelaide Comets FC for the upcoming season, with the deal being made effective the following month. He returned to Spain and its third level on 18 July 2019, signing a one-year contract at CD Atlético Baleares.

On 4 July 2021, following a brief spell at Madrid-based Las Rozas CF, Aurtenetxe moved abroad again with Miedź Legnica in the Polish I liga. He was crowned champion in his first season, with the subsequent promotion to the Ekstraklasa. On 22 February 2023, after making eight appearances in the Polish top division, he left the club by mutual consent.

International career
Aurtenetxe won two caps for the Spain under-21 team, in as many friendlies. His debut was on 13 November 2012, in a 3–1 defeat of Italy in Siena.

Career statistics

Honours
Athletic Bilbao
Copa del Rey runner-up: 2011–12, 2014–15
UEFA Europa League runner-up: 2011–12

Miedź Legnica
I liga: 2021–22

Spain U19
UEFA European Under-19 Championship: 2011

Spain U17
FIFA U-17 World Cup third place: 2009

References

External links

1992 births
Living people
People from Amorebieta-Etxano
Sportspeople from Biscay
Spanish footballers
Footballers from the Basque Country (autonomous community)
Association football defenders
La Liga players
Segunda División players
Segunda División B players
Bilbao Athletic footballers
Athletic Bilbao footballers
RC Celta de Vigo players
CD Tenerife players
CD Mirandés footballers
SD Amorebieta footballers
CD Atlético Baleares footballers
Las Rozas CF players
Scottish Professional Football League players
Dundee F.C. players
National Premier Leagues players
Adelaide Comets FC players
Ekstraklasa players
I liga players
Miedź Legnica players
Spain youth international footballers
Spain under-21 international footballers
Basque Country international footballers
Spanish expatriate footballers
Expatriate footballers in Scotland
Expatriate soccer players in Australia
Expatriate footballers in Poland
Spanish expatriate sportspeople in Scotland
Spanish expatriate sportspeople in Australia
Spanish expatriate sportspeople in Poland